Hugh Lord McDonald (March 25, 1841 – January 27, 1891) was a contractor and political figure in Prince Edward Island in Canada. He represented 3rd Kings in the Legislative Assembly of Prince Edward Island from 1887 to 1890 as a Conservative member.

He was born in Cardigan River, Prince Edward Island, the son of Angus McDonald, a Scottish immigrant. In 1875, he married Anna Louisa Owen. He died in office in 1890.

References

External links 
The Canadian parliamentary companion, 1887 JA Gemmill

1841 births
1891 deaths
People from Kings County, Prince Edward Island
Progressive Conservative Party of Prince Edward Island MLAs